Shivnarine Chanderpaul is an international cricketer who has played for the West Indies since 1994, and captained the team for a short time. He has scored centuries (100 or more runs in a single innings) on 30 occasions in Test cricket and 11 times in One Day International (ODI) matches. He is West Indies' second-most prolific batsman in international cricket, after Brian Lara, having accumulated almost 20,000 runs. He bats with an unorthodox technique, which is often described as "crab-like", and is highly regarded for his "patience and obstinacy at the crease." In his list of the 100 greatest Test players, Shane Warne described Chanderpaul as "a bloke you needed to crowbar away from the crease." In 2008 he was named as one of the five Cricketers of the Year by the Wisden Cricketers' Almanack, and as the Player of the Year by the International Cricket Council.

Chanderpaul made his Test debut in March 1994, selected as an all-rounder who could bowl leg breaks, against England. He reached his first century three years later, scoring an unbeaten 137 against India at the Kensington Oval in Bridgetown. During the initial phase of his career, Chanderpaul was criticised for his inability to convert half-centuries into centuries, but he proved his critics wrong during the 2001–02 series against India when he scored three centuries in five matches, thus earning the man of the series accolade. During that tournament, he batted for 1,513 minutes between dismissals, a record in Test cricket. Despite being well known for his patient batting, Chanderpaul scored a 69-ball century against Australia in 2003, which at the time was the third fastest century in terms of balls faced. His highest score in Test cricket is 203 not out, a total he achieved twice, first against South Africa in 2005, and then against Bangladesh in 2012. He has scored centuries against every Test playing nation with the exception of Sri Lanka, and has scored seven centuries against India, more than any other team.

In ODI cricket, Chanderpaul's debut came seven months after his first Test appearance, but he was not required to bat as the West Indies reached the target to beat India. He scored his maiden ODI century shortly after his first Test century, in May 1997 against India, scoring 109 runs. He reached his highest ODI score in 1999, making 150 runs during a West Indian record partnership of 226 with Carl Hooper, against South Africa. That innings, along with his score of 149 not out against India in 2007 are the only times he has finished a century innings with a strike rate of quicker than a-run-a-ball in ODI cricket.

In both Test and ODI cricket, Chanderpaul has remained not out more often than being dismissed once he has scored a century: in Tests, he has been not out in 18 of 30 innings,  while out of eleven ODI centuries, he was unbeaten eight times. Chanderpaul has not been selected to play Twenty20 International cricket since 2010, and in his 22 appearances prior to that, his highest score was 41 runs. As of February 2015, he is tenth among all-time century makers in international cricket.

Key
 *  Remained not out
 M  Man of the match
   He was the Captain of the West Indies team in that match.

Tests

One Day Internationals

Notes and references
Notes

References

West Indian cricket lists
Chanderpaul, Shivnarine